Jerome D. Henderson (born October 5, 1959) is a retired professional basketball power forward–center who played two seasons in the National Basketball Association (NBA) as a member of the Los Angeles Lakers (1985–86) and the Milwaukee Bucks (1986–87). He attended the University of New Mexico.

External links

1959 births
Living people
American expatriate basketball people in Italy
American expatriate basketball people in the Philippines
American expatriate basketball people in Turkey
American men's basketball players
Anadolu Efes S.K. players
Basketball players from Los Angeles
Centers (basketball)
Columbus Horizon players
Detroit Spirits players
Los Angeles Lakers players
Milwaukee Bucks players
New Mexico Lobos men's basketball players
Pensacola Tornados (1986–1991) players
Philippine Basketball Association imports
Power forwards (basketball)
Rochester Zeniths players
Rockford Lightning players
Topeka Sizzlers players
Tri-City Chinook players
Undrafted National Basketball Association players
Viola Reggio Calabria players
Wabash Valley Warriors men's basketball players
Yakama Sun Kings players